Breivik is a Norwegian surname. Notable people with the surname include:

Anders Behring Breivik (born 1979), perpetrator of the 2011 Norway attacks
Birger Breivik (1912–1996), Norwegian politician
Bård Breivik (1948–2016) Norwegian sculptor
Emil Breivik, Norwegian footballer
Gunnar Breivik (born 1943), Norwegian sociologist
Marit Breivik (born 1955), Norwegian handball player
Terje Breivik (born 1965), Norwegian politician

Norwegian-language surnames
Toponymic surnames